Jacques Mouilleron (born 7 July 1940) is a French former football player and manager.

Career
Mouilleron was born in Bois-Plage en Ré. He signed for Limoges FC at the beginning of the 1960s. Capable of playing in defence or midfield, he was signed in 1964 by SCO Angers, where he stayed for seven seasons, including six in the first division. and with whom he won the French football Division 2 1968–69. From 1971 to 1973, he spent two seasons in D1 with Red Star 93.

In 1973, he signed for Stade Malherbe Caen, in the third division. In November of the same year, aged 33, he became player-manager of the Caen club, to replace Emile Rummelhardt. A year and a half later, the club won the third division and were promoted to D2. Three seasons later, Stade Malherbe were relegated. Jacques Mouilleron left the post in 1979.

Notes and references

External links 

Football blog on Jacques Mouilleron

Living people
1940 births
Association football defenders
French footballers
Limoges FC players
Angers SCO players
Red Star F.C. players
Stade Malherbe Caen players
Ligue 1 players
Ligue 2 players
French football managers
Stade Malherbe Caen managers